Moby Corse is a ferry owned and operated by Moby Lines. She was built at Aalborg Værft A/S in Denmark for DFDS Seaways as MV Dana Anglia and entered service with them in 1978. She sailed between Esbjerg, Denmark and Harwich, United Kingdom between 1978 and 2002 before being renamed MV Duke of Scandinavia for service between Copenhagen, Denmark and Gdańsk, Poland. She returned to the North Sea in 2003 to sail between Newcastle and IJmuiden.

It was announced on 19 December 2007 that the vessel was sold to Brittany Ferries. Her final sailing between Plymouth and Roscoff was on 9 November 2008, after which she was laid up in Saint-Nazaire. In October 2009, the ship was sold to Moby Lines. She was renamed Moby Corse and started the new service from Toulon to Bastia on April 1, 2010.

Regular routes
Plymouth-Roscoff April 2006 – November 2008
Portsmouth-Cherbourg March 2006

Other routes served
Under Brittany Ferries, Pont L'Abbé has only sailed in passenger service on the Plymouth-Roscoff and Portsmouth-Cherbourg routes. She also sailed between Plymouth and St Malo in December 2006.

Media appearances
While registered as Dana Anglia the vessel appeared in several BBC TV Series.  In 1981, A ship named Dana Anglia appeared 
in the BBC TV movie Artemis 81. In 1982-3 she was the setting for the second and third series of the soap opera Triangle. The ship in the first series was Tor Scandinavia.

In 1989 it featured in one episode of the comedy series Birds of a Feather.

In July 2005 in Series 6, Episode 6 of the BBC TV show "Top Gear", the vessel appeared in the background of a shot taken in Newcastle during the Race to Oslo challenge.

References

External links

Ferries of the United Kingdom
Ferries of France
1977 ships
Ships built in Aalborg